Zoi Dimoschaki (Ζωή Δημοσχάκη, born February 16, 1985) is a Greek freestyle swimmer. Dimoschaki administered the Olympic Oath at the Opening Ceremonies of the 2004 Summer Olympics.

Dimoschaki competed in the women's 200 m freestyle, Heat 6 at the 2004 Summer Olympics. She also competed in the Women's 200 m Freestyle at the 2000 Summer Olympics.

She is 6 feet (183 cm) tall.

External links
 IOC 2004 Summer Olympics
 

1985 births
Living people
Olympic swimmers of Greece
Panathinaikos swimmers
Swimmers at the 2000 Summer Olympics
Swimmers at the 2004 Summer Olympics
Greek female freestyle swimmers
Greek female swimmers
Mediterranean Games gold medalists for Greece
Mediterranean Games bronze medalists for Greece
Swimmers at the 2001 Mediterranean Games
Swimmers at the 2005 Mediterranean Games
Oath takers at the Olympic Games
Mediterranean Games medalists in swimming
Swimmers from Athens